Samtgemeinde Meinersen is a Samtgemeinde in the district of Gifhorn, in Lower Saxony, Germany.

Structure of the Samtgemeinde Meinersen

References

Samtgemeinden in Lower Saxony
Gifhorn (district)